Jeffrey Curtis Leach, known as Jeff Leach (born June 10, 1982), is a Republican member of the Texas House of Representatives for District 67, representing a portion of Collin County.

Biography

Leach was born in Plano, Texas and graduated from Plano Senior High School. He attended Baylor University in Waco, Texas. Following graduation from Baylor, Leach earned his J.D. degree from SMU Dedman School of Law in Dallas and currently practices with the Texas law firm, Gray Reed & McGraw, P.C.

Leach specializes in complex commercial and civil litigation, construction law, and real estate. Leach serves on the Board of Trustees for Houston Baptist University, on the Texas Judicial Council, and as a board member of the Texas Conservative Coalition Research Institute. In January 2021, he was appointed to serve on the board of directors of the Prestonwood Pregnancy Center.

In 2020, Leach was angered by tweets from a professor at Collin College, within his district, critical of then-Vice President Mike Pence. He reached out to the president of the college and asked if the professor was "paid with taxpayer dollars." In February 2021, Leach prematurely tweeted that the professor had been fired. Nine days later, the college fired the professor. In January 2022, the college offered the professor a large settlement for violating her First Amendment rights.

Personal life 
Leach and his wife Becky have three children and are members of Cottonwood Creek Church in Allen.

88th Legislative Session 
For the 88th Legislative Session, Representative Leach was appointed as Chairman of the House Committee on Judiciary and Civil Jurisprudence as well as a member of the House Committee on Criminal Jurisprudence.

Committee assignments 
Chair of the House Committee on Judiciary and Civil Jurisprudence

House Committee on Criminal Jurisprudence.

2020 Campaign 
Leach's seat was targeted by the Texas Democratic Party in 2020; however, Leach defeated his opponent, Lorenzo Sanchez, by a margin of 51.7% to 48.3%, despite Democrat Joe Biden winning the 67th district in the concurrent Presidential Election. It was the costliest State House race in the history of Texas.

Honors and recognition
"Best Legislator of the Year" by Texas Monthly magazine
"Champion of Faith and Family" by Texas Values
"Free Enterprise Champion" by the Texas Association of Business
"Courageous Conservative" by the Texas Conservative Coalition 
"Best of Dallas-area's Freshman Class" by Dallas Morning News 
"Top Rated Conservative in the Texas House" by Texas Eagle Forum  
"Taxpayer Champion" by Texans for Fiscal Responsibility
"Best Freshmen Legislator" by Capitol Inside
"Favorite Legislator" by Plano Deputy Mayor Pro Tem Ben Harris

References

External links
Texas House of Representatives - Jeff Leach
JeffLeach.com - Personal Website

District 67 Map
The Texas Tribune - Hot Seat: A Conversation with Leach and Paxton (Video)

1982 births
Living people
Republican Party members of the Texas House of Representatives
Texas lawyers
Businesspeople from Texas
21st-century American politicians
Baylor University alumni
Dedman School of Law alumni
Baptists from Texas